Fritz Richard Gustav Schuft (16 June 1876 in Berlin – 8 February 1948 in Cottbus) was a German gymnast. He competed at the 1896 Summer Olympics in Athens.

Schuft was a member of the German team that won two gold medals by placing first in both of the team events, the parallel bars and the horizontal bar.  He also competed in the parallel bars, horizontal bar, vault, and pommel horse individual events, though without success.

References

External links
 

1876 births
1948 deaths
German male artistic gymnasts
Gymnasts at the 1896 Summer Olympics
19th-century sportsmen
Olympic gold medalists for Germany
Olympic medalists in gymnastics
Medalists at the 1896 Summer Olympics
19th-century German people
20th-century German people
Gymnasts from Berlin